Bedi (formerly: Üzümlü) is a village in the Gölpazarı District, Bilecik Province, Turkey. Its population is 149 (2021).

History 
Bedi village of the ancestors coming from  Oghuz Turks Kayı tribe Karakeçili tribe in history.

The oldest name of Bedi are Çiftlik-i Bedi (1487-1521) and Karyer-i Bedi(1527). Also Bedi name like Oghuz Turks's Beğdili tribe.

References

Villages in Gölpazarı District